The International Racquetball Federation's 3rd Racquetball World Championships was held in Orlando, Florida from August 4 to 10, 1986. This was the third time Worlds were in the USA.

The competition began with the team competition with the US and Canada facing off in both the men's and women's finals. On the men's side, Canada defeated the Americans, In men's singles, Roger Harripersad of Canada beat American Ed Andrews, 15–9, 10–15, 15–11, Ross Harvey (Canada) beat Andy Roberts (USA), 15–10, 15–14, but Egan Inoue (USA) swept Lindsay Meyers (Canada), 15–4, 15–11. In doubles, Americans Jack Nolan and Todd O'Neil defeated the Canadians Glenn Collard and Joe Kirkwood, 13–15, 15–6, 15–6, but the total games were 5-5. The tie-breaker rule was the result of the #1 singles game, which was between Harripersad's defeat of Andrews, so Canada won the men's team title 7–5. It was the first men's team title for Canada.

The American women won the women's team title by defeating Canada in the final by a total of seven games to five. In the singles matches, Cindy Baxter (USA) defeated Crystal Fried (Canada), 15–11, 11–15, 15–13, Heather Stupp (Canada) beat Toni Bevelock (USA), 2–15, 15–8, 15–1, Malia Kamahoahoa (USA) defeated Lisa Devine (Canada), 11–15, 15–10, 15–8, and in doubles Americans Connie Peterson and Michelle Gilman beat the Canadian team of Carol McFetridge and Manon Sicotte, 13–15, 15–6, 15–2.

With the Canadians winning the men's competition 7-5 and the Americans winning the women's competition 7–5, the two countries tied for the overall title.

Americans won three of the four individual competitions, led by Egan Inoue winning what would be his first of two World Championships in men's singles. Cindy Baxter won the second of her two career titles in women's singles, and Jack Nolan and Todd O'Neill won men's doubles. Canadians Carol McFetridge and Manon Sicotte prevented the American sweep by winning women's doubles.

Men's Events

Singles event

Doubles event

Women's Events

Singles event

Doubles event

Team Results

References

External links
IRF website

Racquetball World Championships
Racquetball in the United States
1986 in American sports
1986 in racquetball
International sports competitions hosted by the United States